Marco Zanotti may refer to:

Marco Zanotti (cyclist, born 1974), Italian cyclist
Marco Zanotti (cyclist, born 1988), Italian cyclist